The Nuku Rebellion was an anti-colonial movement that engulfed large parts of Maluku Islands and Western New Guinea between 1780 and 1810. It was initiated by the prince and later sultan of Tidore. Nuku Muhammad Amiruddin (born Soa Siu, Tidore, c. 1738 – dead Tidore, 1805), also known as Prince Nuku or Sultan Nuku. The movement united several ethnic groups of eastern Indonesia in the struggle against the Dutch and was temporarily successful, helped by an alliance with the English East India Company. After the demise of Nuku it was however defeated, and Maluku was restored under European rule. In modern time, Nuku was officially appointed a National Hero of Indonesia.

Background
Nuku or Amiruddin was born in Soa Siu, Tidore, in about 1738. His father was Sultan Jamaluddin, a ruler of the Sultanate of Tidore, who was arrested and exiled to Batavia by the Dutch colonials in 1779. His junior kinsman was Kamaluddin who later became sultan and a rival of Nuku.

Fighting against the Dutch
After the exile of his father, the Dutch appointed Kaicil Gay Jira as regent of the sultanate, who was later replaced by his son, Patra Alam; Amiruddin opposed this replacement. Amiruddin then built a kora-kora armada around Seram Island and Papua, while Patra Alam ruled as Dutch-appointed sultan in 1780–1783.

In 1781, Amiruddin declared that he bore the title "Sri Maha Tuan Sultan Amir Muhammad Saifuddin Syah" ("The Great Overlord Sultan Amir Muhammad Saifuddin, the Shah"). Responding to this, the Dutch attacked and defeated Amiruddin's army; however, Amiruddin was not caught. In 1783, the Dutch attacked Amiruddin's army again. The Dutch commander and most of his men were killed, and the survivors were captured.

In October 1783, the Dutch post on Tidore was attacked by Amiruddin's force, and all the Europeans were killed. This was heating up the rivalry between the kingdom of Ternate and Tidore. In November of the same year, Ternate helped the Dutch attack Tidore. The Dutch then, in December, enforced an agreement and appointed Sultan Hairul Alam Kamaluddin Kaicili Asgar, a prince exiled to Ceylon, as the new puppet sultan.

In 1787, Amiruddin's base in eastern Seram was attacked and seized by the Dutch forces; however, Amiruddin managed to escape. Amiruddin then built a new base in Gorong island. He also entered a friendly relationship with Britain. After receiving some armaments from Britain, Amiruddin's army attacked the Dutch and won the battle. The Dutch then offered Amiruddin a position, if he would negotiate with Sultan Kamaluddin; however, Amiruddin refused the proposition. Instead, he increased the frequency of his attacks against the Dutch, who were assisted by Sultan Kamaluddin's forces. In 1794, Jamaluddin's son Zainal Abidin, who had returned from exile, supported Amiruddin's effort. Several rulers of Papua also sided with him. In February 1795, Abdulgafur, Amiruddin's son, led a force to Tidore. In 1796, British forces seized Banda Island. They also gave limited assistance to Amiruddin to take control of Tidore Island on 12 April 1797, after surrounding the island with 79 of Amiruddin's ships and one British ship. Sultan Kamaluddin escaped to Ternate Island, and Amiruddin was unanimously elected as the new sultan of Tidore. In 1801, Amiruddin and the allied British freed Ternate from the Dutch. This marked the climax of Nuku's movement, and was one of the few victories of indigenous forces over Dutch colonial rule. However, Britain withdrew from Maluku in 1803, leaving Amiruddin to fend for himself. Amiruddin died in 1805. His brother and successor Zainal Abidin was driven out of Tidore by a renewed Dutch attack in 1806 and finally died in 1810 after a largely unsuccessful resistance.

Legacy
Amiruddin was awarded the title National Hero of Indonesia 1995 through Presidential Decree number 071/TK/1995.

See also
Battle of Gorong
Invasion of the Spice Islands

References
Notes

Bibliography

 Andaya, Leonard Y. (1993). The world of Maluku. Honolulu: University of Hawai'i Press.
 Katoppo, E. (1984) Nuku: Perjuangan kemerdekaan di Maluku Utara. Jakarta: Sinar Harapan.

Indonesian rebels
People from Maluku Islands
National Heroes of Indonesia